The 2017–18 Boston College Eagles women's basketball team represents Boston College during the 2017–18 NCAA Division I women's basketball season. The Eagles, were led by sixth year head coach Erik Johnson. They play their home games at the Conte Forum and were members of the Atlantic Coast Conference. They finished the season 7–23, 2–14 in ACC play in a tie for thirteenth place. They lost in the first round of the ACC women's tournament to Pittsburgh.

On March 1, head coach Erik Johnson resigns. He finished at Boston College with a six-year record of 68–115. On April 10, Boston College hired former Albany head coach Joanna Bernabei-McNamee to be the next head coach for Boston College.

Previous season
They finished the season 9–21, 2–14 in ACC play to finish in last place. They lost in the first round of the ACC women's tournament to Georgia Tech.

2016–17 media

Boston College IMG Sports Network Affiliates
Select BC games, mostly home games and conference road games, will be broadcast on ZBC Sports. BC Game notes and stories will continue to be posted through their athletic website and on Twitter by following @bc_wbb.

Roster

Schedule

|-
!colspan=9 style=| Non-conference regular season

|-
!colspan=9 style=| ACC regular season

|-
!colspan=9 style=| ACC Women's Tournament

Rankings

See also
 2017–18 Boston College Eagles men's basketball team

References

Boston College Eagles women's basketball seasons
Boston College
Boston College Eagles women's basketball
Boston College Eagles women's basketball
Boston College Eagles women's basketball
Boston College Eagles women's basketball